Vasyl Stolyar (born April 11, 1962, in Lutsk) is a Ukrainian businessman and chairman of FC Volyn Lutsk.

President of FC Volyn Lutsk 
In March 2000, Vasyl Stolyar founded the Junior Football School "Femida-Inter" (Lutsk), presently Junior Football School "Volyn". Since January 2001 – FC Volyn Lutsk vice-president. Holds the position of FC Volyn Lutsk president since 2003.

Political activities
Stolyar is a member of the Volyn Oblast council (the parliament of Volyn Oblast) since 2006; during the 2006 Ukrainian local elections he was elected on the list of Our Ukraine and during the 2010 Ukrainian local elections he was elected  for Front of Changes. As a member of Front of Changes. On 15 June 2013 his Front for Change (party) merged into "Fatherland".

Family 
Stolyar is divorced and has three sons.

References

External links 
 Vasyl Stolyar's profile on FC Volyn Lutsk official website 

1962 births
Living people
People from Lutsk
Ukrainian businesspeople
Front for Change (Ukraine) politicians
Ukrainian football chairmen and investors
All-Ukrainian Union "Fatherland" politicians
FC Volyn Lutsk